Canta A Juan Gabriel Volumen 6 (also released as Amor Eterno in Mexico and Jardín de Rosas in Spain) is an album by Spanish singer and actress Rocío Dúrcal, which was released in 1984. The songs in the album were written by Mexican singer/songwriter Juan Gabriel who also appeared on the album. Déjame Vivir is one of her biggest hits and the video was a huge hit as well with special guest Juan Gabriel. The album was nominated for a Grammy Award for Best Mexican-American Performance. The album inducted into the Latin Grammy Hall of Fame in 2013.

Track listing

Charts 
 Billboard Albums

Credits and personnel 
Rocío Dúrcal – Vocals
Juan Gabriel – Vocals Arranger, Record producer
Juan Gabriel – writer, composer
Mariachi Arriba Juárez – Arrangement
Sylvia Polakow – Photographs
Cheska – Stylist

References 

1984 albums
Rocío Dúrcal albums
Latin Grammy Hall of Fame Award recipients
Ariola Records albums